In mathematics, specifically in number theory, a Cunningham number is a certain kind of integer named after English mathematician A. J. C. Cunningham.

Definition

Cunningham numbers are a simple type of binomial number – they are of the form

where b and n are integers and b is not a perfect power.  They are denoted C±(b, n).

Primality

Establishing whether or not a given Cunningham number is prime has been the main focus of research around this type of number.  Two particularly famous families of Cunningham numbers in this respect are the Fermat numbers, which are those of the form C+(2, 2m), and the Mersenne numbers, which are of the form C−(2, n).

Cunningham worked on gathering together all known data on which of these numbers were prime. In 1925 he published tables which summarised his findings with H. J. Woodall, and much computation has been done in the intervening time to fill these tables.

See also
Cunningham project

References

External links
Cunningham Number at MathWorld
The Cunningham Project, a collaborative effort to factor Cunningham numbers

Number theory